Simone Paris (1909–1985) was a French stage and film actress.

Selected filmography
 Nine Bachelors (1939)
 The Martyr of Bougival (1949)
 Je l'ai été trois fois (1952)
 Run Away Mr. Perle (1952)
 The Moment of Truth (1952)
 The Count of Monte Cristo (1954)
 Au diable la vertu (1954)
 Yours Truly, Blake (1954)
 The Air of Paris (1954)
 The Affair of the Poisons (1955)
 Napoleon (1955)
 Cela s'appelle l'aurore (1956)
 Don Juan (1956)
 Bob le Flambeur (1956)
 Mademoiselle Strip-tease (1957)
 Isabelle Is Afraid of Men (1957)
 Mon pote le gitan (1959)
 Love and the Frenchwoman (1960)
 A Man and a Woman (1962)
 Love at Sea (1965)
 Hail the Artist (1973)

References

Bibliography
 Edward Baron Turk. Child of Paradise: Marcel Carné and the Golden Age of French Cinema. Harvard University Press, 1989.

External links

1909 births
1985 deaths
French film actresses
French stage actresses
Actresses from Paris
20th-century French actresses